Paul Knochel (born 15 November 1955) is a French chemist and a member of the French Academy of Sciences.

Biography 
Paul Knochel was born in Strasbourg. He studied chemistry at the IUT (Institut Universitaire de Technologie) in Strasbourg, then at the ENSCS (École Nationale Supérieure de Chimie de Strasbourg). From 1979 to 1982, he completed his thesis entitled "Nitroallyl-halogenide und -ester als effiziente Verknüpfungsreagenzien" at ETH (Eidgenössische Technische Hochschule) Zurich (Switzerland) in Prof. Dieter Seebach's group. He then spent 4 years at the CNRS (Centre National de la Recherche Scientifique) at the Pierre et Marie Curie University in Paris in the group of Prof. Jean-François Normant. During this period, he studied carbozincation reactions using allylic reagents and prepared bimetallic compounds bearing two different metals (Lithium, Magnesium or Zinc) on the same carbon atom. He then joined Prof. Martin F. Semmelhack's laboratory for a post-doctoral fellowship during which he worked on the use of indoles-chromium complexes in organic synthesis. In 1987, he accepted a position as Assistant Professor in the Department of Chemistry at the University of Michigan at Ann Arbor (MI, USA) where he developed the first methods for the preparation of polyfunctional organometallic zinc species. In 1991, he was promoted to Professor at the same University before moving to Marburg (Germany) in 1992, where he was offered a position as Professor of Organic Chemistry in the Department of Chemistry at the Philips-Universität University. He continued his work on the chemistry of polyfunctional organozinciques and their use in asymmetric synthesis. In 1999, he was offered a position as Professor of Organic Chemistry at the University of Munich (Ludwig-Maximilians-Universität – LMU) which he still holds in 2019. He has developed new methods for the preparation of polyfunctional organometallic species as well as numerous synthetic methods using organometallic reagents or catalysts.

Scientific work 
Knochel has developed a series of new methods for the preparation of polyfunctional organometallic species of zinc and magnesium, but also many other metals such as copper, aluminium, manganese, indium, iron, lanthanum and samarium. In addition, he highlighted the fact that lithium salts catalyse a significant number of organometallic reactions, including the oxidative addition of a metal such as magnesium, zinc, indium, manganese or aluminium to an organic halide. It has shown that the use of lithium derivatives (chloride, acetylacetonates or alcoholates) catalyses the halogen-metal exchange in the preparation of organomagnesians and organozinciques. In addition, it has synthesized a series of new cluttered metal bases derived from tetramethylpiperidine allowing C-H activations of aromatic and heterocyclic unsaturated systems. He has also conducted research on a series of diastereoselective mixed coupling reactions catalyzed by palladium, iron, cobalt and chromium. He has succeeded in considerably increasing the scope of these organic synthesis reactions through continuous flow chemistry. It has also implemented a synthetic methodology for the preparation of lithians, zinciques and organocuprates with high enantioselectivity and has demonstrated the usefulness of this method for preparing pheromones containing up to five chiral centres. By using additives such as zinc or magnesium pivalate, it has been possible to prepare organozinciques with high stability against air and moisture.

Honours and awards 

 Berthelot Medal of the French Academy of Sciences (Paris) 1992
 IUPAC Thieme Prize 1994
 ECS – European Chemical Society – Chiroscience Award for Creative European Chemistry 1995
 Otto-Bayer Prize 1995
 Leibniz Prize 1996
 Merck Sharp & Dohme Research Award 2000/2001
 V. Grignard Prize 2000
 Dr. Paul Janssen Prize for Creativity in Organic Synthesis 2004
 Cope Scholar Award of the American Chemical Society 2005
 Lilly European Distinguished Lectureship Award 2007
 Member of the French Academy of Sciences (Paris) 2007
 Member of the Bavarian Academy of Science 2008
 Karl-Ziegler-Preis 2009
 Member of the German Academy of Sciences Leopoldina 2009
 EROS (Encyclopedia of Reagents for Organic Synthesis) Best Reagent Award. 2011
 Gold Nagoya Medal of Organic Chemistry 2012
 Chevalier dans l'Ordre national du Mérite 2013
 Herbert C. Brown Award for Creative Research in Synthetic Methods 2014

References

Living people
1955 births
Academic staff of Pierre and Marie Curie University
20th-century French chemists
University of Michigan faculty
Scientists from Strasbourg
21st-century French chemists